Babes on Broadway is a 1941 American musical film starring Mickey Rooney and Judy Garland and directed by Busby Berkeley, with Vincente Minnelli directing Garland's big solo numbers. The film, which features Fay Bainter and Virginia Weidler, was the third in the "Backyard Musical" series about kids who put on their own show, following Babes in Arms (1939) and Strike Up the Band (1940).  Songs in the film include "Babes on Broadway" by Burton Lane (music) and E.Y. "Yip" Harburg (lyrics), and "How About You?" by Lane with lyrics by Ralph Freed, the brother of producer Arthur Freed. The movie ends with a minstrel show performed by the main cast in blackface.

Plot

Cast

Production
Babes on Broadway was the third film in the "Backyard Musical" series, which included Babes in Arms (1939), Strike Up the Band (1940) and Girl Crazy (1943).

The film was stalled in the middle of production when Garland secretly flew to Las Vegas to wed her first husband David Rose. She was 19 years old.

Musical numbers
"Babes on Broadway" (Main Title) (MGM Studio Chorus)
"Anything Can Happen in New York" (Mickey Rooney, Ray McDonald, and Richard Quine)
"How About You?" (Judy Garland and Mickey Rooney)
"Hoe Down" (Judy Garland, Mickey Rooney, Six Hits and a Miss, The Five Musical Maids, and MGM Studio Chorus)
"Chin Up! Cheerio! Carry On!" (Judy Garland, St. Luke's Episcopal Church Choristers, and MGM Studio Chorus)
Ghost Theater Sequence:
"Cyrano de Bergerac" (Mickey Rooney as Richard Mansfield)
"Mary's a Grand Old Name" (Judy Garland as Fay Templeton)
"She's Ma Daisy" (Mickey Rooney as Harry Lauder)
"I've Got Rings On My Fingers" (Judy Garland as Blanche Ring)
"La Marseillaise" (Judy Garland as Sarah Bernhardt)
"The Yankee Doodle Boy" (Mickey Rooney and Judy Garland)
"Bombshell from Brazil" (Judy Garland, Mickey Rooney, Richard Quine, Ray McDonald, Virginia Weidler, Anne Rooney, Robert Bradford, and MGM Studio Chorus)
"Mama Yo Quiero" (Mickey Rooney)
Minstrel Show Sequence:
"Blackout Over Broadway" (Judy Garland, Mickey Rooney, Ray McDonald, Virginia Weidler, Richard Quine, Anne Rooney and MGM Studio Chorus)
"By the Light of the Silvery Moon" (Ray McDonald)
"Franklin D. Roosevelt Jones" (Judy Garland and MGM Studio Chorus)
"Old Folks at Home" (Eddie Peabody on banjo, dubbing for Mickey Rooney)
"Alabamy Bound" (Eddie Peabody on banjo, dubbing for Mickey Rooney)
"Waiting for the Robert E. Lee" (Judy Garland, Mickey Rooney, Virginia Weidler, Anne Rooney, Richard Quine, and MGM Studio Chorus)
"Babes on Broadway" (Finale) (Judy Garland, Mickey Rooney, Virginia Weidler, Ray McDonald, Richard Quine, and MGM Studio Chorus)

Box office
According to MGM records, the film earned $2,363,000 in the US and Canada and $1,496,000 elsewhere resulting in a profit of $1,720,000.

Home media
Babes on Broadway was released on DVD for the first time as part of a 5-disc DVD set The Mickey Rooney & Judy Garland Collection on September 25, 2007. The set contains Babes on Broadway, Babes in Arms, Girl Crazy, and Strike Up the Band, as well as a fifth disc containing bonus features on Rooney and Garland.

References

External links

 
 
The Judy Garland Online Discography "Babes On Broadway" page

1941 films
1941 musical films
American black-and-white films
1940s English-language films
Metro-Goldwyn-Mayer films
Films directed by Busby Berkeley
Films produced by Arthur Freed
Films scored by Georgie Stoll
American musical films
Blackface minstrel shows and films
1940s American films